Nino Navarra (Alcamo, 1885 – Kars Plateau, 6 June 1917) was an Italian poet, writer and orator.

Biography 
He was born from Leonardo Navarra and Cecilia Triolo of the barons of Sant'Anna, and died during World War I in 1917, at the age of 32. He was an infantry second lieutenant who fell for his country and Silver Medal for Military Valor.

At the age of twenty (in 1905), he published a collection of sonnets entitled L'annunziazione, which easily brings back to the name of his model, Gabriele D'Annunzio. As he received several approvals for his compositions, Navarra left his home town to attend the Roman literary circles, where he met D'Annunzio, in the period when the poet was also successful with his dramatic works..

He collaborated with the Italian cultural magazine  Scena illustrata and with the French periodical  Eclair.  In Paris the poet acquired estimate for his oratorical skills which took him to give a series of lectures on literary subjects in Germany and Brazil, where he had the opportunity of sharing his lyrics that were very expressive and full of musicality  now mobile and lithe, now slow and serious.

Poetics 
I tried to link all the images of my lyrical impetuosity to a dominant Image, more spiritual and higher, free from any restraint and compulsion, not searched with an artificial effort, but offered by itself as a beautiful and very pure thing, always smiling in the bottom of my thought.

In his poetry he sings the fullness of life:

we drink a scent in each flower

and every day we break a chain

and exalts the heroic action:
tomorrow the hero will come, he will have silver weapons.

Navarra nostalgically remembers his domestic peace and the family affections in his  youth,  worries for  loneliness and the premonition of a premature end.

In a little essay by the Academy Lo Frutto, dedicated to Navarra "a soldjer poet"  during the dedication of the homonymous junior high school in Alcamo in 1950, the literary critic professor Giuseppe Cottone said: Navarra's literary style following that of  D’Annunzio,  is all in the unlimited devotion to Beauty which was on top of his ideals. A follower of D’Annunzio, then, not so much for love of  contemporaneity nor because he was  D’Annunzio's friend, but for a natural and deep affinity of temperament.

Gozzano succeeded, so to say, to D'Annunzio, who Nino Navarra approaches for his Arcadian sentiment and for the cult of ancient Greece as the birthplace of spirit. In all his poems there are the ideals and dreams of a twenty-years-old aged poet.

Navarra closes his first verse collection with a hope:
Soul, be your Faith stronger than Time

(...) Soul, I throw you towards Life(...)

Now it is better that I prepare my future myself.

Works 
 Segesta; Alcamo, 1901
 Tra fiore e sogno, Alcamo, 1901
 Annunziazione, a collection of sonnets, published in Alcamo in 1905.

References

Sources 
 Andrea Chiarelli e Dario Cocchiara:Alcamo nel XX secolo; ed. Campo; Alcamo, 2005
 Lo frutto, i 150 anni del Liceo Classico di Alcamo, a cura di Francesco Melia e Gaetano Stellino p. 80; ed. Campo; Alcamo, 2012

External links  
 
 Comune di Alcamo – Alcamesi illustri
 Alqamah – Grande successo per gli alunni dell'”I.C Nino Navarra” di Alcamo al 20º Concorso Musicale Città di Caccamo” Premio Benedetto Albanese”
 Ideazione news.it – Istituto Nino Navarra fa centro con uno splendido concerto di Natale

People from Alcamo
1917 deaths
1885 births
20th-century Italian poets
Italian rhetoricians
20th-century Italian male writers
Italian military personnel killed in World War I